Omobranchus hikkaduwensis is a species of combtooth blenny found in the western central Pacific and eastern Indian ocean.

References

hikkaduwensis
Taxa named by Hans Bath
Fish described in 1983